Niko may refer to:

People 
The given name is sometimes a short form of Nikola, Nikolas, Nikolaos or others.
 Nikō (1253–1314), Japanese Buddhist disciple of Nichiren
 Niko (musician), American musician active from 2002
 NiKo (born 1997), Bosnian professional esports player
 Niko Etxart (born 1953), Basque singer and musician
 Niko Hurme (born 1974), Finnish bass player
 Niko Kovač (born 1971), Croatian soccer player and manager
 Niko Kranjčar (born 1984), Croatian soccer player
 Niko Lalos (born 1997), American football player
 Niko Moon (born 1982), American singer and songwriter
 Niko Nirvi (born 1961), Finnish journalist
 Niko Ott (born 1945), West German rower
 Niko Pirosmani (1862–1918), Georgian painter
 Maurizio De Jorio (born 1967), Italian Eurobeat artist using the stage name Niko

Fictional characters 
 Niko Bellic, the main character of the game Grand Theft Auto IV
 Niklaren Goldeye (nickname Niko), a character in Tamora Pierce's Emelan books
 Niko, in the 1994 film The Mask
 Niko, the main character in the 2008 animated Christmas film The Flight Before Christmas
 Niko, the playable protagonist of the video game OneShot
 Dr. Niko "Nick" Tatopoulos, the main character in the 1998 film Godzilla
 Niko Leandros, in the Cal Leandros book series by Rob Thurman

Other uses
 Nikō (company), former name of Japanese camera-maker Cosina
 Niko Resources, Canadian oil and gas company
 Niko, a common abbreviation of Mykolaiv (Ukrainian), also known as Nikolaev or Nikolayev (Russian), a city in southern Ukraine

See also
 Niko & the Way to the Stars, a 2008 animated film in Finnish
 Nikko (disambiguation)
 Nikos, a given name (including a list of people with the name)
 Nico (disambiguation)

Unisex given names
Albanian masculine given names